This is a partial list of language codes from the withdrawn ISO 639-6 standard.

References
 

ISO 639